Shiner High School is a public high school located in Shiner, Texas, United States and classified as a 2A school by the UIL. It is part of the Shiner Independent School District located in western Lavaca County. In 2015, the school was rated "Met Standard" by the Texas Education Agency.

Athletics
The Shiner Comanches compete in these sports - 

Baseball
Basketball
Cross Country
Football
Softball
Tennis
Track and Field
Volleyball
Golf

State titles
Baseball - 
1981(2A), 1992(2A), 2002(1A), 2004(1A)
Football - 
1986(2A), 2004(1A), 2020 (2A Div. 1), 2021 (2A Div. 1)
Softball - 
2001(1A), 2002(1A), 2008(1A), 2011(1A), 2015(2A),2016 (2A)
Track & Field
 2016 Girls (2A), 2020 Boys (2A)

State Finalists
Girls Basketball - 
1974(1A)
Football - 
2003(1A), 2013(1A/D1)
Softball - 
2007(1A), 2017 (2A)
Baseball
2022(2A)
UIL Lone Star Cup Champions 
2001(1A), 2002(1A), 2015(2A), 2021 (2A)

Band
UIL Marching Band Champions 
2013(1A), 2022 (2A)

State Advancing 
2017(2A)

State Runners Up 
2021 (2A)

Notable alumni
Carroll Sembera (Class of 1959), Major League Baseball relief pitcher for Houston Astros & Montreal Expos

References

External links
Shiner ISD
Shiner Comanche Sports

Schools in Lavaca County, Texas
Public high schools in Texas
Public middle schools in Texas